Eraño de Guzman Manalo (January 2, 1925 – August 31, 2009), also known as Ka Erdy, was the second Executive Minister of the Iglesia ni Cristo (INC), serving from April 19, 1963, until August 31, 2009. He took over the administration of the church after the death of his father, Felix Y. Manalo, in 1963. He was instrumental in the propagation and expansion of the church internationally.

Biography
Eraño G. Manalo was born at their Home at No. 42 Broadway Avenue, New Manila, San Juan, Rizal (now part of Quezon City) on January 2, 1925. He was the fifth child of Felix Y. Manalo and Honorata de Guzman. His name came from a reversal and elision of the term "New Era", which his father used to describe what he felt was "a new Christian era" as the Iglesia ni Cristo was established. His older siblings were Sisters Pilar and Avelina, and Brothers Dominador and Salvador. His youngest sibling is Brother Bienvenido, who is currently the head of INC's construction and engineering department.

Eraño completed his elementary education at St. John's Academy in San Juan, Metro Manila, starting at the age of six.

Manalo initially took up law school, but left his studies to become a minister of the INC. He started attending the church's ministerial classes at the age of 16 and was ordained as a minister on May 10, 1947, in Locale Congregation of Tayuman, Ecclesiastical District of Manila, at the age of 22. He held various positions in the church including being the General Treasurer of the INC and circulation manager of the Pasugo magazine (now known as Pasugo: God's Message). During this time, he wrote a 64-page booklet entitled Christ-God: Investigated-False.

On January 17, 1955, Eraño Manalo married Cristina Villanueva with whom he has six children (Eduardo V. Manalo, Lolita Manalo-Hemedez, Erlinda Manalo-Alcantara, Liberty Manalo-Albert, Felix Nathaniel Manalo II and Marco Eraño Manalo). On February 18, 1953, ten years before his father's death, Eraño G. Manalo was elected successor to his father as Executive Minister. Following Eraño's death, his son Eduardo then assumed the role of INC's Executive Minister.

Administration

With the death of Felix Y. Manalo on April 12, 1963, Iglesia's critics predicted the church's decline and eventual fall. To them, the church's popularity was due mainly to the charisma and leadership of Felix Y. Manalo. Barely a month after assuming his role as spiritual leader of the church, the young Manalo began visiting congregations nationwide. At every location he visited, he officiated worship services and staged massive religious rallies in public plazas. During this period of transition in what critics thought was the most vulnerable period of the church, Manalo further consolidated the gains of the church.

In 1947, Manalo became the General Treasurer of the church. He was later elected as successor to Felix Y. Manalo by provincial ministers as early as 1953. In 1957 he became the District Minister of Manila. Very few people outside of the church gave Manalo's leadership potential enough credit. He would later initiate significant moves that would make the church to what it is today.

Manalo demonstrated the church responsiveness to the needs of the poor. Even before the government initiated agrarian reforms, Manalo established model land reforms. In 1965, the first of the resettlement farms was Maligaya farm in Palayan City, Nueva Ecija, Philippines. Similar projects were established in Cavite, Rizal and other provinces.

As early as 1967, four years after assuming leadership role, Manalo set his vision to overseas mission and global expansion. The first overseas INC mission was sent in 1968 on its 54th anniversary. On July 27, 1968, Executive Minister Eraño G. Manalo, officiated at the first worship service of the church outside the Philippines. This gathering held in Ewa Beach, Honolulu, Hawaii marked the establishment of the Honolulu congregation, the first overseas mission of the church. The following month, the Executive Minister was in California to establish the San Francisco congregation and lead its inaugural worship service. In 1971, the church set foot in Canada. In June 1987, the US Main Office (USMO) was set up in Daly City, California to assist the INC central administration in supervising the then 11 districts of the church in the West. The first local congregation in Latin America was established in Guantánamo Bay, Cuba in 1990. The following year, the church reached Mexico and Aruba. From 2000 and beyond, congregations rose in the Central and South American countries. The first local congregation in Europe was established in England in 1972. The church came to Germany and Switzerland in the mid-70s. By the end of the 1980s, congregations and missions could be found in the Scandinavian countries and their neighbors. The Rome, Italy congregation was established on July 27, 1994; the Jerusalem, Israel congregation on March 31, 1996; and the Athens, Greece congregation on May 10, 1997. The predecessors (prayer groups) of these full-fledged congregations began two decades earlier. Meanwhile, the mission first reached Spain in 1979. The first mission in northern Africa opened in Nigeria in October 1978. After a month, the King William’s Town congregation, in South Africa was established. A congregation was organised in Guam in 1969. In Australia, congregations have been established since mid-1970s. The church first reached China by way of Hong Kong, and Japan through Tokyo also in the 1970s. Missions have also opened in Kazakh SSR (now Kazakhstan) and Sakhalin Island in Russian SFSR (now Russia). In Southeast Asia, the first congregation in Thailand was established in 1976 and missions have already been conducted in Brunei since 1979. In addition, there are also congregations in Vietnam, Indonesia, Singapore, and Malaysia.

The INC started operating a radio station in 1969. While its first television program aired in 1983. The Ministerial Institute of Development, currently the New Era University College of Evangelical Ministry (later called as Iglesia ni Cristo School for Ministers), was founded in 1974 in Quiapo, Manila. It moved to its current location in Quezon City in 1978. As of 1995, it had 4,500 students and five extension schools in Bulacan, Cavite, Laguna, Pampanga and Rizal. In 1965, INC launched its first resettlement and land reform program in Barrio Maligaya, Laur, Nueva Ecija. In 1971, the INC Central Office building was built in Quezon City. Thirteen years later, the 7,000-seater Central Temple was added in the complex. The Tabernacle, a tent-like multipurpose building which can accommodate up to 4,000 persons, was finished in 1989. The complex also includes the New Era University, a higher-education institution run by the INC.

Death
INC Spokesperson and General Evangelist, Bienvenido C. Santiago Sr, confirmed Manalo's death in an announcement delivered in Tagalog over various radio and television stations, translated below:

Santiago also stated that according to Dr. Ray Melchor Santos, Manalo died due to cardiopulmonary arrest. On Monday September 7, 2009, the remains of Manalo were temporarily interred at the INC Tabernacle at 12:00 PST while his mausoleum is being built near the memorial statue of his father, Felix Y. Manalo at INC Central Office Complex. President Gloria Macapagal Arroyo declared September 7 a national day of mourning.

Recognition

The Quezon City government renamed what was Central Avenue to Eraño G. Manalo Avenue. Ordinance number SP-1961 S-2009 the Quezon City Council stated the renaming was to is recognition of "“his greatness and nobility” in leading the powerful religious group."

On April 13, 2010, The Philippine Postal Corporation announced that it will issue a limited edition postage stamp in his honour. The stamp will be released on April 23 with 100,000 pieces with a denomination of P 7.00.

Media portrayal
 Portrayed by AJ Muhlach and Gabby Concepcion in the 2015 film, Felix Manalo.

Family Tree

References

External links
Iglesia Ni Cristo Media Services
Iglesia Ni Cristo official website

1925 births
2009 deaths
Erano
Filipino Christian religious leaders
Filipino evangelists
People from San Juan, Metro Manila
Tagalog people